Courthouse station is a light rail station in Downtown Salt Lake City, Utah, United States serviced by all three lines of Utah Transit Authority's TRAX light rail system. The Blue Line provides service from Downtown Salt Lake City to Draper. The Red Line provides service from the University of Utah to the Daybreak community of South Jordan. The Green Line provides service from the Salt Lake City International Airport to West Valley City (via Downtown Salt Lake City).

Description 
The station is located at 450 South Main Street, with the island platform in the median of Main Street. Courthouse Station is so named as it is situated just southeast of the Frank E. Moss United States Courthouse and west of the Scott M. Matheson Courthouse. An area known as Hotel Row, with a large number of hotels and motels, is south and west of the Station. The Station is the last northbound station serviced by all three TRAX lines.  The station opened on 4 December 1999 and was part of the first operating segment of the TRAX system. It is operated by the Utah Transit Authority. Courthouse is the last southbound station within the Free Fare Zone in Downtown Salt Lake City. Transportation patrons that both enter and exit bus or TRAX service within the Zone can ride at no charge. Unlike many TRAX stations, Courthouse does not have a Park and Ride lot. The whole block immediately west of the Station is a single large pay-for-parking lot that sometimes hosts special events.

Notes

References 

TRAX (light rail) stations
Railway stations in the United States opened in 1999
Railway stations in Salt Lake City
1999 establishments in Utah